The 26 Bristol and Exeter Railway 4-4-0ST locomotives were broad gauge  steam locomotives. They first entered service in 1855 and the last was withdrawn in 1892. The Bristol and Exeter Railway was amalgamated into the Great Western Railway on 1 January 1876.

The locomotives were built in four batches, each by a different builder, with variations between them, noticeably in the size of the saddle tank.

List of locomotives

1859 Rothwell locomotives
Five locomotives built by Rothwell and Company with  gallon saddle tanks and  wheelbase.
 47 (1855–1879) GWR No. 2028
 48 (1855–1879) GWR No. 2029
 49 (1855–1884) GWR No. 2030
 50 (1855–1884) GWR No. 2031
 51 (1855–1882) GWR No. 2032
 52 (1855–1880) GWR No. 2033

1862 Beyer, Peacock locomotives
Four locomotives built by Beyer Peacock with  saddle tanks and  wheelbase.
 61 (1862–1884) GWR No. 2034
 62 (1862–1886) GWR No. 2035
 63 (1862–1880) GWR No. 2036
 64 (1862–1886) GWR No. 2037

1867 Vulcan Foundry locomotives
Ten locomotives built by the Vulcan Foundry with  saddle tanks and  wheelbase, the same as the Beyer, Peacock locomotives built five years earlier.
 65 (1867–1880) GWR No. 2038
 66 (1867–1892) GWR No. 2039
 67 (1867–1888) GWR No. 2040
 68 (1867–1880) GWR No. 2041
 69 (1867–1892) GWR No. 2042
 70 (1867–1888) GWR No. 2043
 71 (1867–1882) GWR No. 2044
 72 (1867–1892) GWR No. 2045
 73 (1867–1889) GWR No, 2046
 74 (1867–1892) GWR No. 2047

1872 Avonside locomotives
Six locomotives built by the Avonside Engine Company with  saddle tanks and  wheelbase.
 85 (1872–1892) GWR No. 2048
 86 (1872–1892) GWR No. 2049
 87 (1873–1892) GWR No. 2050
 88 (1873–1890) GWR No. 2051
 89 (1873–1892) GWR No. 2052
 90 (1873–1892) GWR No. 2053

No. 2051 was withdrawn following a fatal collision at Norton Fitzwarren railway station in Somerset while working a special ocean mail train from Plymouth on 11 November 1890.

References
 
 

Broad gauge (7 feet) railway locomotives
4-4-0ST locomotives
Beyer, Peacock locomotives
Vulcan Foundry locomotives
Avonside locomotives
Bristol and Exeter Railway locomotives
Railway locomotives introduced in 1855
Scrapped locomotives